The 1999 Harlow District Council election took place on 6 May 1999 to elect members of  Harlow District Council in Essex, England. One third of the council was up for election and the Labour party stayed in overall control of the council.

After the election, the composition of the council was
Labour 34
Liberal Democrats 4
Conservative 4

Election result
Labour remained in control of the council with 34 of the 42 seats, compared to 4 each for the Conservatives and Liberal Democrats. Labour won 9 of the 14 seats contested, but lost 3 seats to the Conservatives in Great Parndon, Kingsmoor and Potter Street wards. The Liberal Democrats also gained a seat from Labour in Mark Hall South, while retaining a seat in Stewards ward. Overall turnout at the election was 29.85%.

All comparisons in vote share are to the corresponding 1995 election.

Ward results

Brays Grove

Great Parndon

Katherines with Sumners

Kingsmoor

Latton Bush

Little Parndon

Mark Hall North

Mark Hall South

Netteswell East

Old Harlow

Passmores

Potter Street

Stewards

Tye Green

References

1999
1999 English local elections
1990s in Essex